Niyogi Books is an independent publishing house based in New Delhi, India, that focuses on illustrated non-fiction books across art, architecture, travel, history, food, and culture. It was founded in 2004 by Bikash De Niyogi, and started off publishing coffee table books, but soon after expanded its remit to include general trade non-fiction and, more recently, fiction books. Niyogi also published the English translation of Mai, a novel by Booker-winner Geetanjali Shree, in 2017. In 2019, it launched 'Bahuvachan', an imprint dedicated to Hindi-language titles. The noted art historian B.N. Goswamy has extensively published with Niyogi. In May 2022, Niyogi announced its entry into publishing children's books.

References

Academic publishing companies
2004 establishments in Delhi
Organizations established in 2000
Publishing companies established in 2004
Companies based in Delhi
Book publishing companies of India